Evan Roberts (born July 11, 1983) is an American sports radio personality. He currently co-hosts the Carton and Roberts radio show, along with Craig Carton, weekdays from 2 p.m. to 6:30 p.m. ET on the New York radio stations WFAN-AM and WFAN-FM.

Biography

Early years 
Roberts grew up in Cedarhurst, New York and graduated from Lawrence High School in 2001.

Roberts' career began at the age of 10 when he had an opportunity to do updates for WFAN's Imus in the Morning radio program.  He then hosted his own radio show called Kidsports on WGBB and expanded it to a wider kids audience with a show called Going Bzircus; a few years later, he hosted "What's Up With Evan Roberts" and Nets Slammin' Planet  with Albert King and Brandon "Scoop B" Robinson for the now-defunct Radio AAHS (later AAHS World Radio) children's radio network. In 1996, Roberts played "Boy Dancing in Field with Father Lawrence" in the film Tromeo & Juliet. In 1997, Roberts played a role in the Howard Stern's movie autobiography Private Parts as Elliot.

Professional radio career 
After graduating from high school he worked for XM Satellite Radio in Washington, D.C. for 2 years. In 2003 and 2004, he worked for WJFK in Baltimore, Maryland and then moved back to New York to host his own show on Maxim Radio, a channel on Sirius Satellite Radio.

In July 2004, Roberts was hired as an overnight host on WFAN.

On Jan. 2, 2007, Roberts moved from overnights to a midday show. He teamed up with Joe Benigno to cohost the “Benigno & Roberts in the Midday”, which aired weekdays from 10 a.m. to 1 p.m. on WFAN.  This show lasted in that timeslot for 11 years. On January 2, 2018, with the initial departure of Mike Francesa from his 1 p.m. to 6:30 p.m. show, the Benigno and Roberts show was increased by 1 hour, now airing on weekdays from 10 a.m. to 2 p.m.

On January 2, 2020, following a subsequent retirement by Francesa, the 13 year midday show got elevated to an afternoon program Joe & Evan, airing from 2 p.m. to 6:30 p.m. This new afternoon show lasted until November 6, 2020, when Benigno retired from full-time work, ending a 14-year partnership with Roberts.

On November 9, 2020, a new show with Roberts and Craig Carton, Carton and Roberts, replaced Joe & Evan as the afternoon drive radio show, airing from 2 p.m. to 7 p.m.

Aside from his regular WFAN work, Roberts started The Evan Roberts Podcast on Radio.com, on March 29, 2018, The podcast does not have a regular schedule, but rather is on-demand, when Roberts wants to give his instant opinions right after an exciting sporting event or an interesting news story breaks outside of his normal show.

Roberts also hosts a show with Joe Beningo  on Saturday mornings on WFAN, from 10 a.m. to 1 p.m.

Personal life 
Roberts is an avid fan of the New York Mets, Brooklyn Nets, New York Islanders, New York Jets, as well as WWE.

References

External links
Evan Roberts « CBS New York

1983 births
Living people
American sports radio personalities
Radio personalities from New York City
People from Cedarhurst, New York
Lawrence High School (Cedarhurst, New York) alumni